The 2018 Sultan Azlan Shah Cup was the 27th edition of the Sultan Azlan Shah Cup. It was held in Ipoh, Perak, Malaysia from 3 to 10 March 2018.

The number of teams for this year's cup was the same as last year's tournament where six teams competed. Japan and New Zealand, who competed previously, did not join this edition and were replaced by Argentina and Ireland. England was Great Britain's only country that participated in this edition.

Australia clinched their tenth title in this tournament after defeating England 2–1 in the final match.

Participating nations
Six countries participated in this year's tournament:

 (Host)

Results
All times are in Malaysia Standard Time (UTC+08:00).

Pool

Classification

Fifth and sixth place

Third and fourth place

Final

Statistics

Goalscorers

Final standings

Awards
Five awards were awarded during the tournament, they were:
Fairplay: 
Best Player:  Daniel Beale
Man of the Match (Final):  Mark Knowles
Best Goalkeeper:  George Pinner
Top Scorer:  Gonzalo Peillat (8 goals)

References

External links
Official website

2018
2018 in field hockey
2018 in Malaysian sport
2018 in Australian field hockey
2018 in English sport
2018 in Argentine sport
2018 in Indian sport
2018 in Irish sport
March 2018 sports events in Malaysia